The Laguna 16 is an American trailerable sailboat that was designed by W. Shad Turner as a day sailer and first built in 1984.

Production
The design was built by Laguna Yachts  in Stanton, California, United States starting in 1981. The company had bought out Coastal Recreation, Inc of Costa Mesa, California and made it a subsidiary. Coastal Recreation's 1981 Balboa 16 design was developed into the Laguna 16 in 1984. Laguna went out of business in 1986 and the design is no longer in production.

Design
The Laguna 16 is a small recreational keelboat. It is built predominantly of fiberglass, with wood trim. It has a masthead sloop rig with anodized aluminum spars and a transom-sheeted mainsheet. The hull features a raked stem, a plumb transom, a transom-hung rudder controlled by a tiller and a fixed, shallow-draft fin keel. It displaces  and carries  of ballast.

It is normally fitted with a small outboard motor for docking and maneuvering.

See also
List of sailing boat types

Similar sailboats
Catalina 16.5
DS-16
Leeward 16
Martin 16
Nordica 16
Tanzer 16

References

Keelboats
1980s sailboat type designs
Sailing yachts
Trailer sailers
Sailboat type designs by W. Shad Turner
Sailboat types built by Laguna Yachts